Taxus chinensis is a species of yew. It is commonly called the Chinese yew, though this term also refers to Taxus celebica or Taxus sumatrana.

This plant is used to produce medicines for cancer treatment, including Paclitaxel and Taxifolin (found in Taxus chinensis var. mairei). It can also be used in many other ways and is protected in various ways under Chinese and international law.

References

External links
 Taxus chinensis / Chinese yew at the American Conifer Society

chinensis
Trees of China
Least concern plants
Plants used in bonsai
Plants described in 1903